St Hilda's School was a private day school for girls aged 3–16 and boys up to age 11 in Westcliff-on-Sea, Southend-on-Sea, Essex, England. It was one of few independent schools in the county which did not have a sixth form.

History
St Hilda's predecessor school, St Clare's, was founded by Mrs Tunnicliffe in 1946 at Thorpe Bay. St Clare's soon outgrew its premises and new buildings in Westcliff-on-Sea were purchased. St Hilda's was opened in January 1947. The school was owned by Mrs Tunnicliffe's family.

Closure 
St Hilda's School was foreclosed and closed on short notice in the summer of 2014. The last school day was 14 July 2014. The Echo newspaper reported that the school may have closed due to highly increasing levels of debt in its final years. Its headteacher Susan O'Riordan and financial director Steven Gorridge had both resigned as directors from the management board of the school on 30 April 2014. In a statement, the school's directors said that "excess capacity" for independent school places in the area was behind the decision. "We have sought finance, possible buyers and mergers, and various other possibilities notwithstanding considerable financial input from ourselves," they stated. The insolvency firm DKF Insolvency Ltd assisted with the school's liquidation.

Former pupils 
 Hannah Tointon, actress
 Kara Tointon, actress

References

External links
 St Hilda's School
Profile on the ISC website
ISI Inspection Reports

Educational institutions established in 1946
1946 establishments in England
Defunct schools in Southend-on-Sea
Educational institutions disestablished in 2014
2014 disestablishments in England